Constance Brandon Usher was an Australian pianist. She was sister to Beatrice Usher (professional actress),  and daughter of Alfred Samuel Usher, the son of carpenter Alfred Ralph Brandon Usher and not to be confused with violinist and composer Alfred Usher (son of Richard Usher, died 1864).

Constance studied in Leipzig Conservatory for four years. She came back to her homeland in late 1902. She married Commander Balkie Simpson, R.N.R.

On 6 July 1907 she performed in Sydney with Cyril Monk the Violin Sonata No. 3 by Alfred Hill.

References 

Australian classical pianists
19th-century classical pianists
Australian women pianists
19th-century Australian musicians
20th-century classical pianists
20th-century Australian musicians
Women classical pianists
University of Music and Theatre Leipzig alumni
20th-century Australian women
19th-century women pianists
20th-century women pianists